The First Avenue South Bridge is a pair of double-leaf bascule bridges built between 1956 and 1998 that carry State Route 99 over the Duwamish River about three miles (5 km) south of downtown Seattle, Washington.

The present day northbound span was built in 1956 to connect the industrial areas northeast of the Duwamish to the residential neighborhoods to the south and southwest. Between 1996 and 1998, the drawspan was retrofitted and the approaches completely demolished and rebuilt. The southbound span opened in February 1997 and carried traffic in both directions for two years while the northbound span was rebuilt.

In 2001, the southbound span was damaged by the Nisqually earthquake, knocking its piers 3 inches out of alignment, and was closed briefly for repairs.

From the original construction to February 1995 when the retrofit began, the First Ave S bridge had the highest motor vehicle accident rate in Washington State.

Notes

References
  — memoirs of a civil engineer working for the WSDOT on the First Avenue South Bridge

External links

Bascule bridges in the United States
Bridges in Seattle
Bridges completed in 1956
Bridges completed in 1997
Road bridges in Washington (state)
1956 establishments in Washington (state)